The Minister of Foreign and European Affairs is the head of the Ministry of Foreign and European Affairs of the Slovak Republic and handles foreign policy of the Slovak Republic.

Ministers of Foreign Affairs 
The ministry was founded in 1990 as the "Ministry of International Relations of Slovak Republic". Since 1992, it has been known by the name "Ministry of Foreign Affairs of Slovak Republic". "European Affairs" was added to its name in 2012.

References

See also
 Ministry of Foreign Affairs (Slovakia)

Lists of political office-holders in Slovakia